El Príncipe is the debut album by Puerto Rican reggaeton and hip hop artist Cosculluela. It was released on December 1, 2009 by White Lion Records and Rottweilas Inc. The album features collaborations with Ivy Queen, De La Ghetto, Jowell & Randy, Zion & Lennox, Jomar, Kendo and O'Neill (from Joan & O'Neill). It debuted at number three on the Top Latin Albums chart and number 185 on the Billboard 200.

Track listing
 "Sube y Baja"  — 3:37
 "Warrior"  — 5:50
 "Na Na Nau"  — 3:26
 "Pienso En Tí"  — 4:16
 "Prrrum"  — 3:58
 "Yo No Se Bailar"  — 3:18
 "En Ocasiones"  — 3:48
 "Plaka Plaka"  — 3:19
 "Con El Pensamiento"  — 4:49
 "Dividiendo Bandos (Intro)"   — 0:15
 "Dividiendo Bandos"  — 3:53
 "Te Deseo El Mal"  — 4:55
 "Invencible (Intro)"  — 1:12
 "Invencible"  — 3:46
 "Un Pesito"  — 3:26
El Principe: Ghost Edition (bonus tracks)
 "De Noche y De Dia" featuring Yandel
 "Cuidau Au Au"
 "Prrrum" featuring Wisin & Yandel
 "Prrrum" remix featuring Nardo Ranks
 "Humo"

Charts

Album certification

References

External links
CD Universe, "El Príncipe", El Príncipe on CDUniverse.com

2009 debut albums
Cosculluela albums